Dawid Olejniczak was the defending champion, but lost to Im Kyu-tae in quarterfinals.
The qualifier 
Dick Norman won in the final 6–4, 6–7(6), 7–5, against Marcel Felder.

Seeds

Draw

Final four

Top half

Bottom half

References
 Main Draw
 Qualifying Draw

Abierto Internacional Varonil Club Casablanca - Singles
2009 Singles